The Ambrose School is a K-12 private, classical Christian school in Meridian, Idaho, United States. The Ambrose School is accredited by the Association of Classical Christian Schools.  In 2016, the school had 544 students in grades K-12. The Ambrose School graduated its first class in 2006.  The school's curriculum is distinct in that it teaches Latin in grades 3–10, Greek in grades 9–10, emphasizes the Western historical tradition, the Great Books of the Western World, Grammar, Logic, and Rhetoric.  The school operates as a 501(c)(3) Christian ministry.

History
The Ambrose School opened in 1995 in Boise with three students under the name "Foundations Academy." It grew to 220 students in 2006 when it renamed its high school St. Ambrose Christian High School. Then, in 2008, the school became The Ambrose School, encompassing grades K-12.  In 2009, The Ambrose School moved to its present location at 6100 N. Locust Grove in Meridian.

References

1995 establishments in Idaho
Christian schools in Idaho
Classical Christian schools
Educational institutions established in 1995
Meridian, Idaho
Private elementary schools in Idaho
Private middle schools in Idaho
Private high schools in Idaho
Schools in Ada County, Idaho